WOLF-FM (92.1 MHz) is a radio station serving the community of Baldwinsville, New York in the Syracuse, New York metropolitan area. The station is owned by Craig Fox, through licensee FoxFur Communications, LLC, and is currently running a country music format branded as 92.1 The Wolf.

History
In 1967, the station began operations as a full-time country outlet as WSEN-FM. It was the sister station to WSEN 1050, one of the first country stations in the northeastern United States. Century Radio sold the stations in 1974.

On September 7, 1975, WSEN-FM began operating on a 24-hour basis continuing with a country music format hosted by Carl Knight from 1-6 a.m. The new 24 hour full-time programming lineup included: Bob Paris 6-10 a.m.; Daniel J. Dunn 10 a.m. - 2 p.m.; "Uncle" Rob 2-6 p.m.; Les Howard 6-10 p.m.; Al Jenner 10 p.m. - 1 a.m.

In 1986, the station format flipped to oldies. Both AM and FM were owned by Buckley Broadcasting during much of the 2000s, until being sold in 2008 to Leatherstocking Media Group.

In 2011, as the oldies format drifted into classic hits, WSEN (at the time playing a 1960s/1970s mix of songs) split its simulcast: the FM side switched to a modern-leaning classic hits format centered on the 1970s and 1980s, while the AM side went for a "real oldies" approach featuring 1950s and 1960s music.

Acquisition by Family Life and trade with Craig Fox
In late 2015, the station was sold to the Family Life Network, a regional religious broadcaster, along with WMCR-FM and rights to WFBL. WSEN-FM's intellectual property (including all on-air programming and staff contracts, but not the rights to the WSEN call sign) was sold to Galaxy Communications, who merged it with that of WZUN (which Galaxy reacquired in February 2016).

Family Life Network then promptly traded the 92.1 license to Craig Fox in exchange for the former WOLF-FM (105.1) in DeRuyter and WWLF-FM (96.7) in Oswego. WOLF's country music format was installed on 92.1 on March 29 at 5:00 p.m. The WSEN-FM call letters were swapped with Fox's WNDR-FM on April 6, 2016. The station adopted the WOLF-FM call sign on April 14, 2016.

On June 15, 2016, the Federal Communications Commission (FCC) denied the trade and fined FoxFur and Wolf Radio $20,000 for violating the multiple ownership rule (because the companies' owner Craig Fox illegally operated eight licenses, where ownership limits in the market are seven).

In late June 2016, FoxFur filed a second request for the transfer of 105.1 and 96.7 to Family Life. However, because of the FCC's ruling, FoxFur ceased operation of WOLF-FM. As a result, Fox temporarily installed the country music format on his station WOSW. The station's previous owner, Family Life, then simulcasted WOSW on 92.1 until the transfer was finalized. At the time, WOLF-FM was the only station in FLN's portfolio running secular programming.

The transaction was approved in September 2016 and the consummation occurred simultaneously with FoxFur's purchase of WFBL on August 21, 2017 in order to keep Fox under the ownership limits in the market. The transfer of translator W252AC to Family Life and translator W207BH to FoxFur affiliate Wolf Radio, Inc. was also included in the final deal.

Shortly after the consummation in late 2017, WOLF-FM began HD radio broadcasts. It also began simulcasting sister stations WSEN and WMVN on its HD2 and HD3 subchannels, respectively.

Repeaters and translators

References

External links

OLF-FM
Radio stations established in 1967
1967 establishments in New York (state)